The women's 1000 metres competition at the 2022 European Speed Skating Championships was held on 9 January 2022.

Results
The race was started at 15:22.

References

Women's 1000 metres